Albert John Baynham (25 September 1875–1951) was an English footballer who played in the Football League for Wolverhampton Wanderers.

References

1875 births
1951 deaths
English footballers
Association football forwards
English Football League players
Halesowen Town F.C. players
Wolverhampton Wanderers F.C. players